Murtizapur Assembly constituency is one of the 288 constituencies of Maharashtra Vidhan Sabha and one of the five which are located in the Akola district. It is reserved for a Scheduled Caste candidate.

It is a part of the Akola (Lok Sabha constituency) along with five other assembly constituencies, viz Akot, Balapur, Akola West, and Akola East and Risod  from the Washim district.

As per orders of Delimitation of Parliamentary and Assembly constituencies Order, 2008, No. 32 Murtizapur Assembly constituency is composed of the following: 
1. Murtizapur Tehsil, 2. Barshitakli Tehsil, and 3. Akola Tehsil (Part), Revenue Circle - Kurankhed. of the district.

Members of Legislative Assembly

Election Results

2009 Elections
 Harish Marotiappa Pimpale (BJP) : 50,333 votes
 Palaspagar Baldev Sukhaev (BBM) : 34975

1967 Elections
 P.B. Tidake (INC) : 27,593 votes  
 S.P. Pachade (IND) : 13,774

See also
Murtajapur
Barshitakli
Kurankhed
UJALESHWAR
CCIT

Notes

Assembly constituencies of Maharashtra
Akola district